Universidad Istmo Americana F.C. is a Mexican football club that plays in the Tercera División de México. The club is based in   Coatzacoalcos, Veracruz. The club represents the  Universidad Istmo Americana F.C.

See also
Football in Mexico
Veracruz
Tercera División de México

External links
Official Page

References 

Football clubs in Veracruz
2005 establishments in Mexico